M'Liss is slang for the name Melissa.

M'Liss may also refer to 
 "Mliss", a short story by Bret Harte
 M'Liss (1915 film)
 M'Liss (1918 film)
 M'Liss (1936 film)